Le Courrier français may refer to:
 Le Courrier français (1820–1851), a Liberal journal published in France
 Le Courrier français (1884–1913), a satirical magazine published in France
 Le Courrier français (1948–1950), a royalist monthly published by the supporters of the Count of Paris